The Villa in Tiergarten Park is a 1927 German silent romance film directed by Franz Osten and starring Joe Stöckel, Aud Egede-Nissen, and Elsa Krueger. It still survives unlike many films from the silent era.

The film's sets were designed by Max Heilbronner.

Synopsis
The easygoing lifestyle of a playboy bachelor and his friends who live in a village in Berlin's Tiergarten Park is threatened by the arrival of a new disciplinarian housekeeper.

Cast

References

Bibliography

External links

1927 films
Films of the Weimar Republic
German silent feature films
Films directed by Franz Osten
Films based on German novels
Films set in Berlin
German black-and-white films
1920s romance films
German romance films
1920s German films